Wright's Flour Mill is located in Wharf Road, Ponders End, Enfield. It is Enfield's oldest working industrial building.

History 
Some of the present buildings date back to 1789 and include the brick Georgian miller's house and offices flanking a 3½-storey watermill of brick and white weatherboarding. There has been a mill here since at least the late 16th century and possibly Domesday. George Reynolds Wright took full control of the mill in 1870. Originally powered by  a back water of the River Lea.  In 1913 owing to construction work at the nearby King George V Reservoir the water supply which powered the millstones was cut off. The machinery was then converted to electricity. Since then further improvements have been made.

Today 
The business is still owned by the Wright family making it London's only family owned flour mill

External links
 G.W.Wright&Sons
 Photographs of mill and surrounding area
 Ponders End flour mill conservation area

Further reading
Buildings of England London 4: North by Bridget Cherry and Nikolaus Pevsner p 451

References 

Enfield, London
History of the London Borough of Enfield
Buildings and structures in the London Borough of Enfield
Watermills in London